Bo Storm (born 3 February 1987 in Nordborg) is a retired Danish footballer, who currently is the assistant manager of Danish 1st Division club FC Roskilde.

Career
He has played several games for the Danish youth national teams (U-16, U-17, U-18, U-20 and U-21). Storm played youth football with AGF Aarhus, but began his career in a small town club called Odder. He joined SC Heerenveen in 2003 and currently plays for Danish side FC Roskilde.

On 11 December 2015 it was confirmed, that Storm would leave SønderjyskE at the end of the year.

References

External links
Danish national team profile
Official Danish Superliga stats

1987 births
Living people
People from Sønderborg Municipality
Danish men's footballers
Denmark under-21 international footballers
SC Heerenveen players
FC Nordsjælland players
U.S. Pergolettese 1932 players
HB Køge players
SønderjyskE Fodbold players
Danish Superliga players
Danish expatriate men's footballers
Expatriate footballers in the Netherlands
Expatriate footballers in Italy
Association football midfielders
Sportspeople from the Region of Southern Denmark